Marineland of New Zealand was a marine mammal park in Napier, New Zealand. The park opened in 1965 and closed to the public in 2008. During the time it was open, Marineland housed several species of native and introduced marine wildlife, most notably including the common dolphin.

History

1960s

The history of Marineland began in 1964 when an Auckland architectural firm was commissioned by Napier City under mayor Peter Tait to design an aquarium and dolphin pool. In late January 1965 Marineland caught its first common dolphin, Daphne, and the facility opened two days later. In 1969, two dolphins died when vandals broke in and fed them nails.

By the end of the 1960s the site had exhibited dusky dolphins, California sea lions, leopard seals and New Zealand fur seals. In the 1970s, Marineland welcomed bottlenose dolphins, weddell seals, and small clawed otters arrived from Melbourne Zoo. 

In the 1980s and 1990s, significant development occurred at Marineland with the construction of a grandstand and a new Marine Education Centre with funding from New Zealand Lotteries Commission grant In 1992, a very popular "Swim With Dolphins" programme was established.

Marineland closed to the public in September 2008 when Kelly, the last remaining dolphin, died. Many of the animals and staff were transferred to National Aquarium of New Zealand, also in Napier. In September 2013, Napier City Council announced that Marineland was to be demolished and replaced with a skatepark, known as Bay Skate.

Notable animals

Marineland was notable for housing common dolphins, which are rarer than the bottlenose dolphin in captivity. The last two dolphins kept by Marineland, Kelly and Shona, arrived in 1974. Shona died in 2006 and Kelly died on 11 September 2008, possibly due to stomach cancer. Her death triggered the closure of Marineland to the public. 

In addition to the dolphins, Marineland also housed New Zealand fur seals, California sea lions, and a leopard seal. Many of the animals kept at Marineland were either brought in sick or injured, or were bred from animals that were brought to the park sick and injured. Other animals were also acquired from other zoos, including Sea Life Park in Hawaii. 

Marineland was also home to a breeding colony of little penguins established from sick and injured birds, which were moved to the National Aquarium in Napier. A wide range of birds were also kept at Marineland over the years, including Australasian gannets and a sulphur crested cockatoo known as Bobby.

Legal issues with manager

The final manager of Napier's Marineland, Gary Macdonald, resigned on 18 November 2009 after 32 years at Marineland after investigations found he falsified documentation to keep wild animals illegally.

"What I did was totally wrong & I should've been informing DOC of exactly what I was doing," said Mr Macdonald in live statements after the investigation.
Investigations into the council-owned tourist attraction were started by The Department of Conservation about the false paperwork on 11 November 2009.

Napier City Council chief executive of the time Neil Taylor explained the investigations showed three or more wild seal pups were documented as being born in Marineland, enabling the facility to keep them rather than release the animals back to the wild. The council probe revealed false declarations were filed in 1996, 2006, and 2007, stating in all cases that the pups had arrived malnourished, harassed, or at risk for treatment.

DOC completed an investigation but decided against prosecution of Marineland, satisfied with Mr Macdonald's resignation.

References

External links

http://tvnz.co.nz/national-news/questions-over-marineland-s-fur-seals-3135570/video
http://www.nzherald.co.nz/hawkes-bay-today/news/article.cfm?c_id=1503462&objectid=10989122

Aquaria in New Zealand
Oceanaria
Buildings and structures in Napier, New Zealand
Tourist attractions in the Hawke's Bay Region
1965 establishments in New Zealand
2008 disestablishments in New Zealand
1960s architecture in New Zealand